Michael Parsons (born August 6, 1979) is a Bermudian soccer player who currently plays for Bermuda Hogges in the USL Second Division.

Career

Club
Parsons played in the Bermudian Premier Division for both Boulevard Blazers and the Dandy Town Hornets before joining the Bermuda Hogges in the USL Second Division in 2007.

International

References

1979 births
Living people
Bermuda Hogges F.C. players
USL Second Division players
Association football defenders
Bermudian footballers
Bermuda international footballers